Peter Young (born in Sydney, New South Wales) was an Australian professional rugby league footballer for the Western Suburbs Magpies in the Australian New South Wales Rugby League premiership competition. Young played front row for the magpies in the number 13 jersey throughout his career.

Career playing statistics

Point scoring summary

Matches played

References

External links
 Profile at Rugby League Project

Living people
Australian rugby league players
Country New South Wales rugby league team players
Rugby league players from Sydney
Western Suburbs Magpies players
Year of birth missing (living people)